Jaguar is an extended play (EP) by American singer-songwriter Victoria Monét, released on August 7, 2020 via Tribe Records and Platoon LTD. It was supported by three singles; "Ass Like That", "Moment" and "Experience", the latter also with Khalid and SG Lewis, as well as the promotional single "Dive". A short film for the project was released on July 28, 2020. Jaguar is a funk inspired-R&B project, with elements of disco music.

In an interview with Apple Music, Monét disclosed that she refers to Jaguar as a "project", as it will be released in three separate parts which will eventually come together to form her debut studio album. Upon release, Jaguar received widespread acclaim from music critics, many of whom praised its musical direction and lyricism. The project was ranked in year-end lists by many publications.

Background
After collaborating with Ariana Grande on the song "Monopoly" in April 2019, Monét revealed she had begun working on her next project. Monét was announced as Apple Music's Up Next artist in February 2020. On June 26, 2020, Monét officially announced the project on her social media simultaneously unveiling the cover art. On July 28, 2020, a short film was premiered with the album's track listing being revealed in the film, anticipating the album.

Singles
On October 22, 2019, Monét released the lead single from Jaguar, "Ass Like That". The song was about loving oneself and accomplishing their personal goals. On February 6, 2020, Monét released the second single "Moment" with its music video being released on February 20. Monét would perform "Moment" and make her late night television debut on Jimmy Kimmel Live! in March 2020. This was followed by the promotional single, "Dive" on April 21, 2020. On June 19, 2020, Monét released the third official single, "Experience" with Khalid and SG Lewis, alongside the pre-order of the project.

A music video for the title track was premiered on the release date of the entire project.

Critical reception

Jaguar received widespread acclaim from music critics. At Metacritic, which assigns a normalised rating out of 100 to reviews from mainstream critics, the album has an average score of 82 based on seven reviews, indicating "universal acclaim". Album of the Year collected 6 reviews and calculated an average of 80 out of 100. Nicolas-Tyrell Scott of NME gave Jaguar a 4-out-5-star-rating, and said "this record heralds [Monét] as one of the most enticing acts in R&B’s contemporary canon, near-guaranteed to become a bonafide star in her own right." Wongo Okon from Uproxx also gave the album a positive review, saying it "far exceeds her previous releases" thanks to her "sharp-as-ever pen and a sound that has been tweaked to accentuate her artistry."

Robin Murray of Clash gave the album a 9 out of 10 score and called Jaguar "a daring yet highly finessed triumph." He goes onto say "It’s a wonderful experience, with Victoria Monét’s stellar artistry balancing the sensuality of sound with a killer lyrical flair that aims straight for the heart." On another positive review, Dani Blum of Pitchfork gave Jaguar a score of 7.1 out of 10, noting that the project is "a sleek cocoon of funk-tinged R&B that excavates what it means to be in control."

Year-end lists

Track listing
Credits adapted from album's liner notes.

Notes
  signifies an additional producer

Charts

Release history

References 

2020 EPs